Oncideres satyra is a species of beetle in the family Cerambycidae. It was described by Henry Walter Bates in 1865. It is known from Brazil, Peru, French Guiana, Bolivia, Guyana and Suriname.

References

satyra
Beetles described in 1865